Larry Anastasi (born September 6, 1934) is an American foil and epee fencer. He competed at the 1964 and 1968 Summer Olympics. On June 26, 2013 Anastasi was inducted into the United States Fencing Hall of Fame.

References

External links
 

1934 births
Living people
American male épée fencers
American male foil fencers
Olympic fencers of the United States
Fencers at the 1964 Summer Olympics
Fencers at the 1968 Summer Olympics
Pan American Games medalists in fencing
Pan American Games gold medalists for the United States
Fencers at the 1963 Pan American Games
20th-century American people
21st-century American people